Interstate 190 (I-190) is an auxiliary Interstate Highway in the US state of Illinois. I-190 is the westernmost leg of the Kennedy Expressway.

Route description 

I-190 has two lanes in either direction between I-90 and I-294 and three lanes west of I-294. The freeway portion of I-190 consists largely of cloverleaf interchanges. The Chicago Transit Authority's Blue Line operates in the median of I-190 for the highway's entire length.

Each road crossing I-190 is accessible via exit ramps. Not all interchanges are accessible in the same way from both directions, however. For example, the exit to southbound US Route 12 (US 12)/US 45 traveling eastbound on I-190 requires exiting at Bessie Coleman Drive. Westbound, direct access is provided.

There is no specific sign indicating I-190's western terminus at O'Hare. Interstate-standard freeway ends roughly at the ramps to the upper (departure) and lower (arrival) loops. The freeway then resumes shortly after both loops merge to cross an emergency fire lane.

The eastern terminus, I-90, is considered to be the origin point of the highway. Both exit numbers and mileage markers on roadside light fixtures ascend traveling westbound.

History 
The highway that is now I-190 was signed as part of Illinois Route 194 (IL 194) from 1960 to 1970. In 1971, it was changed to Illinois Route 594 (IL 594). Then, it was changed to I-190 around 1978 after the rest of IL 194 was changed to I-90 in the mid- to late 1970s.

In late 2005, the intersection with Mannheim Road was reconstructed to remove unsafe conditions and bring the route closer to Interstate standards. In the late 1990s, the Illinois Department of Transportation (IDOT) restriped I-190 at I-294. This action increased the number of lanes west of I-294 from two to three. This created a hazardous condition, often leading to high-speed crashes should drivers waiting on the ramp become impatient or underestimate the speed of westbound traffic. Often, an IDOT Minuteman (rapid response vehicle) would be stationed on the ramp waiting to tow away vehicles that were involved in crashes during rush hour.

Exit list 

Although exit numbers on I-190 increase from east to west, this table presents interchanges from west to east to follow IDOT milepost measurements starting at O'Hare.

References

External links 

Kurumi's Highway Page: Interstate 190

90-1
90-1 Illinois
1 (Illinois)
Expressways in the Chicago area
Interstate 190